The James Joule Medal and Prize is awarded by the Institute of Physics. It was established in 2008, and was named in honour of James Prescott Joule, British physicist and brewer. The award is made for distinguished contributions to applied physics. The medal is silver and is accompanied by a prize of £1000.

The medal gained international recognition in 2018 when it was awarded to Sri Lankan scientist Ravi Silva of University of Surrey, whose work in part led to the establishment of the Sri Lanka Institute of Nanotechnology (SLINTec).

Recipients 
The following persons have received this medal:
 2021 Bajram Zeqiri, for development of acoustic measurement techniques and sensors
 2020 Richard Bowtell, for new hardware and techniques for biomedical imaging
 2019 Robert Hadfield, for infrared single photon detection technology
 2018 Ravi Silva, for carbon nanomaterials
 2017 Henry Snaith, for metal-halide perovskite solar cells
 2015 Judith Driscoll, for strongly correlated oxides
 2013 Paul French, for fluorescence-lifetime imaging microscopy
 2011 Donald D Arnone, for terahertz radiation research
 2009 Jenny Nelson, for theoretical analysis of photovoltaic materials
 2008 David Parker, for positron emission particle tracking

See also
 Institute of Physics Awards
 List of physics awards
 List of awards named after people

References 

Awards established in 2008
Awards of the Institute of Physics
Physics awards
Education awards